Nymfopetra is a village and a community of the Volvi municipality. Before the 2011 local government reform it was part of the municipality of Egnatia, of which it was a municipal district. The 2011 census recorded 609 inhabitants in the village and 678 in the community. The community of Nymfopetra covers an area of 28.799 km2.

Administrative division
The community of Nymfopetra consists of two separate settlements: 
Nymfopetra (population 609)
Vaiochori (population 69)
The aforementioned populations are as of 2011.

See also
 List of settlements in the Thessaloniki regional unit

References

Populated places in Thessaloniki (regional unit)